TSS Slieve Bawn was a twin screw steamer cargo vessel operated by the London, Midland and Scottish Railway from 1935 to 1948, and the British Transport Commission from 1948 to 1962.

History

She was built by William Denny and Brothers of Dumbarton, launched in 1936 and handed over to the London, Midland and Scottish Railway in 1937.

She was named after the mountain Slieve Bawn in Ireland

She replaced the Slieve Gallion of 1907.

References

1936 ships
Passenger ships of the United Kingdom
Steamships
Ships built on the River Clyde
Ships of the London, Midland and Scottish Railway
Ships of British Rail